Bronchocela rayaensis, the Gunung Raya green-crested lizard, is a species of agamid lizard. It is endemic to Malay Peninsula and is known from Langkawi in Kedah, northwestern part of Peninsular Malaysia (its type locality), as well as from Phuket and Phang Nga Provinces in southern Thailand.

References

Bronchocela
Reptiles of Malaysia
Reptiles of Thailand
Reptiles described in 2015
Taxa named by Larry Lee Grismer
Taxa named by Perry L. Wood
Taxa named by Evan Quah
Taxa named by Shahrul Anuar
Taxa named by Jack W. Sites Jr.
Reptiles of the Malay Peninsula